Niteflyte is the debut self-titled album by Niteflyte, released in 1979 on Ariola Records.

The album peaked at No. 59 on Billboard's Top Soul LPs chart. "If You Want It" is the band's only top 40 entry on Billboard's Hot 100 and Hot Soul Singles charts, peaking at No. 37 and No. 21, respectively.

Track listing

Personnel
Niteflyte
Howard Johnson – percussion, lead and backing vocals
Sandy Torano – guitar, lead and backing vocals

Additional musicians
Hamish Stuart – guitar, backing vocals
Phyllis Hyman – backing vocals
Frank Cornelius – bass
Frank Garvis – bass
Lamont Johnson – bass
Cedrick Wright – drums
Joe Galdo – drums
Steve Ferrone – drums
Jack Waldman – keyboards
Richie Puente – percussion
Rubens Bassini – percussion
Angelo di Braccio – saxophone
David Sanborn – saxophone
Bob Schumacher – saxophone
Michael Brecker – saxophone
Randy Brecker – trumpet

Production
Producer: Barry Mraz, Sandy Torano
Photography: John Hamagami

Charts
Album

Singles

References

External links

1979 albums
Ariola Records albums